Strahinja Kerkez (born 13 December 2002) is a professional footballer currently playing as a defender for AS Trenčín of the Fortuna Liga. Born in Serbia, he is a youth international for Cyprus.

Personal life
Srahinja is the son of former Bosnia and Herzegovina international footballer Dušan Kerkez, who currently manages Čukarički.

Career statistics

Club

Notes

References

2002 births
Living people
Footballers from Belgrade
Cypriot footballers
Cypriot expatriate footballers
Cyprus youth international footballers
Cyprus under-21 international footballers
Serbian footballers
Cypriot people of Bosnia and Herzegovina descent
Serbian emigrants to Cyprus
Serbian people of Bosnia and Herzegovina descent
Association football defenders
AEL Limassol players
FC Juniors OÖ players
AS Trenčín players
Cypriot First Division players
2. Liga (Austria) players
Slovak Super Liga players
Expatriate footballers in Austria
Cypriot expatriate sportspeople in Austria
Expatriate footballers in Slovakia
Cypriot expatriate sportspeople in Slovakia